István Fülöp (born 4 May 1958) is a Hungarian politician, member of the National Assembly (MP) for Mátészalka (Szabolcs-Szatmár-Bereg County Constituency IX) between 2002 and 2014.

He was a member of the Hungarian Democratic Forum (MDF) until 2004 when expelled from the party along with other members of the Lakitelek Group led by Sándor Lezsák. They founded the National Forum which alliance with the Fidesz in that year. Fülöp, later, joined Fidesz in 2005. He was the President of the Szabolcs-Szatmar-Bereg county government from 2006 to 2008.

Personal life
He is married. His wife is Judit Fülöpné Kecskés. They have two sons, Arnold and Ákos.

References

1958 births
Living people
Hungarian Calvinist and Reformed Christians
Hungarian Democratic Forum politicians
Fidesz politicians
Members of the National Assembly of Hungary (2002–2006)
Members of the National Assembly of Hungary (2006–2010)
Members of the National Assembly of Hungary (2010–2014)
People from Vásárosnamény